Yakty-Yul (Yaqtı Yul) is a rural locality (a village) in Ishlinsky Selsoviet, Aurgazinsky District, Bashkortostan, Russia. The population was 52 as of 2010. There is 1 street.

Geography 
Yakty-Yul is located 20 km north of Tolbazy (the district's administrative centre) by road. Arslanovo is the nearest rural locality.

References 

Rural localities in Aurgazinsky District